Three Brothers is a 7,303-foot-elevation (2,226 meter) triple-peak mountain summit located in Chelan County of Washington state. It is situated 1.3 miles east of Navaho Peak, on the boundary of the Alpine Lakes Wilderness, on land managed by Wenatchee National Forest. Three Brothers is the third-highest point in the Teanaway area of the Wenatchee Mountains. Precipitation runoff from the peak drains into tributaries of the Wenatchee River. The view from the summit of this peak showcases the impressive Mount Stuart and Stuart Range for those who climb it.

Climate

Lying east of the Cascade crest, the area around Three Brothers is drier than areas to the west. Summers can bring warm temperatures and occasional thunderstorms. Most weather fronts originate in the Pacific Ocean, and travel east toward the Cascade Mountains. As fronts approach, they are forced upward by the peaks of the Cascade Range, causing them to drop their moisture in the form of rain or snowfall onto the Cascades (Orographic lift). As a result, the eastern slopes of the Cascades experience lower precipitation than the western slopes. During winter months, weather is usually cloudy, but due to high pressure systems over the Pacific Ocean that intensify during summer months, there is often little or no cloud cover during the summer.

Geology

The Alpine Lakes Wilderness features some of the most rugged topography in the Cascade Range with craggy peaks and ridges, deep glacial valleys, and granite walls spotted with over 700 mountain lakes. Geological events occurring many years ago created the diverse topography and drastic elevation changes over the Cascade Range leading to the various climate differences.

The history of the formation of the Cascade Mountains dates back millions of years ago to the late Eocene Epoch. With the North American Plate overriding the Pacific Plate, episodes of volcanic igneous activity persisted. In addition, small fragments of the oceanic and continental lithosphere called terranes created the North Cascades about 50 million years ago.

During the Pleistocene period dating back over two million years ago, glaciation advancing and retreating repeatedly scoured and shaped the landscape. The last glacial retreat in the Alpine Lakes area began about 14,000 years ago and was north of the Canada–US border by 10,000 years ago. The "U"-shaped cross section of the river valleys are a result of that recent glaciation. Uplift and faulting in combination with glaciation have been the dominant processes which have created the tall peaks and deep valleys of the Alpine Lakes Wilderness area.

See also

 Geology of the Pacific Northwest
 List of peaks of the Alpine Lakes Wilderness

Gallery

References

External links
 Three Brothers: weather forecast

Mountains of Washington (state)
Wenatchee National Forest
Cascade Range
Mountains of Chelan County, Washington
North American 2000 m summits